The Istanbul Railway Museum is a railway museum situated within the historic İstanbul Sirkeci Terminal at Sirkeci neighborhood of Fatih district in Istanbul, Turkey. Opened on September 23, 2005, the museum is owned and operated by the Turkish State Railways (TCDD).

In the museum, which is housed in the 1888-built and 1890-opened railway terminal, around 300 historical items are on display. The exhibits of the museum covering an area of  include parts of the trains and the railway stations, photographs, and related documents. A few of these are furniture and silver services used in dining cars, station office equipment, the driver cab of an electric  suburban train, manufacturer plates of some historic TCDD rolling stock, warning plates, and a station's clock and bell.

It was reported that 52,774 people, among them 31,153 foreign tourists, visited the museum in 2006.

Admission

The museum is open every day except Sundays and Mondays, between 9:00 and 17:00. Admission is free of charge.

Address:
İstanbul Sirkeci Terminal
Sirkeci, Istanbul

See also
 Çamlık Railway Museum in Selçuk, Izmir Province
 TCDD Open Air Steam Locomotive Museum in Ankara
 Atatürk's Residence and Railway Museum

References

Railway museums in Turkey
Museums in Istanbul
Museums established in 2005
2005 establishments in Turkey
Turkish State Railways
Fatih